Copelatus fijiensis is a species of diving beetle. It is part of the genus Copelatus of the subfamily Copelatinae in the family Dytiscidae. It was described by Félix Guignot in 1955.

References

fijiensis
Beetles described in 1955